Haripur is an upazila of Thakurgaon District in the Division of Rangpur, Bangladesh.

Geography
It has 19559 households and total area 201.06 km2.

Haripur upazila is bounded by Ranisankail Upazila on north and on the east, Hemtabad and Raiganj CD blocks in Uttar Dinajpur district, West Bengal, India, on the south and Karandighi and Goalpokhar I CD blocks in Uttar Dinajpur district on the west.

Demographics
As of the 1991 Bangladesh census, Haripur has a population of 101658. Males constitute 50.93% of the population, and females 49.07%. This Upazila's eighteen up population is 49922. Haripur has an average literacy rate of 19.5% (7+ years), and the national average of 32.4% literate.

Administration
Haripur Thana was formed in 1914 and it was turned into an upazila in 1983.

Haripur Upazila is divided into six union parishads: Amgaon, Bakua, Bhaturia, Dangipara, Gedura, and Haripur. The union parishads are subdivided into 75 mauzas and 70 villages.

Gallery

See also
Upazilas of Bangladesh 
Districts of Bangladesh 
Divisions of Bangladesh

References

Upazilas of Thakurgaon District